Eddie L. Cheatham (born March 14, 1947) is an American Democratic politician from South Arkansas. He served in the Arkansas General Assembly from 2007 until losing a reelection bid in November 2020.

Elections
2012 With Senate District 26 Senator Percy Malone retired and left the seat open, Cheatham placed first in the three-way May 22, 2012 Democratic Primary with 4,157 votes (36.3%); former Representative Johnnie Bolin placed third. Cheatham won the June 22 runoff election with 4,033 votes (54.1%), and won the November 6, 2012 General election with 14,479 votes (50.6%) against Republican nominee Mike Akin.
2006 Initially in House District 9, when Representative Johnnie Bolin left the Legislature and left the seat open, Cheatham won the 2006 Democratic Primary and was unopposed for the November 7, 2006 General election.
2008 Cheatham was unopposed for both the May 20, 2008 Democratic Primary and the November 4, 2008 General election.
2010 Cheatham was unopposed for both the May 18, 2010 Democratic Primary and the November 2, 2010 General election.

References

External links
Official page at the Arkansas General Assembly

Eddie Cheatham at Ballotpedia
Eddie L. Cheatham at the National Institute on Money in State Politics

1947 births
Living people
Democratic Party Arkansas state senators
Democratic Party members of the Arkansas House of Representatives
People from Crossett, Arkansas
People from Magnolia, Arkansas
21st-century American politicians